Camillus Paul Maes (March 13, 1846 – May 11, 1915) was a Belgian-born American prelate of the Catholic Church. He served as the third Bishop of Covington from 1885 until his death in 1915. He remains the longest-serving bishop of the diocese and, during his 30 years in office, he was most notably responsible for building the current Cathedral Basilica of the Assumption.

Early life and education
Camillus Paul Maes (recorded as Camille Polydore Maes in the civil record of his birth) was born in Kortrijk, West Flanders, on March 13, 1846. He was the only child of Jean Baptiste and Justine (née Ghyoot) Maes. Orphaned by age 16, he was subsequently raised by an uncle. He received his classical education at St. Amand's College in Kortrijk, graduating in 1863. He then entered the Minor Seminary of Roeselare and continued his studies for the priesthood at the Major Seminary of Bruges, studying under Bernard Jungmann at both institutions.

In 1867, Bishop Peter Paul Lefevere was touring Belgium to recruit priests for the Diocese of Detroit. As a favor to Lefevere for assuming his duties during an illness, Bishop Johan Joseph Faict of Bruges agreed to give him a seminarian of his choice and Lefevere chose Maes, who had expressed a desire to become a foreign missionary. Maes was then sent to the American College of Louvain to complete his theological studies.

Priesthood
Maes was ordained a priest on December 19, 1868 by Bishop Charles Anthonis, an auxiliary bishop of the Archdiocese of Mechelen. Two days later, he performed his first Mass at the Church of Our Lady in his native Kortrijk. He left Belgium a few months later and arrived in the United States in May 1869. His first assignment was to St. Peter's Church in Mount Clemens, whose founding pastor was Gabriel Richard (the first Catholic priest to serve in Congress). At St. Peter's, Maes established a parochial school with the help of the Sisters, Servants of the Immaculate Heart of Mary.

After two years in Mount Clemens, he was transferred to Monroe in 1871 to become pastor of St. Mary's Church. The congregation there consisted mostly of French and English-speaking Catholics until Bishop Caspar Henry Borgess directed Maes to organize a new parish to accommodate the growing English-speaking faction. Maes opened St. John the Baptist Church in 1873 and was appointed its first pastor. During his seven years as pastor there, he wrote a widely a widely acclaimed biography of his fellow Belgian Charles Nerinckx, one of the first Catholic missionaries in Kentucky and the founder of the Sisters of Loretto.

Bishop Borgess named Maes as his secretary and chancellor of the diocese in 1880. When the Diocese of Grand Rapids was erected in 1882, Maes was included on the list of candidates for bishop that was sent to Rome but the title was ultimately given to Henry Richter.

Bishop of Covington
On September 11, 1884, a telegram from Rome announced that Pope Leo XIII appointed Maes to be Bishop of Covington in Kentucky. At the same consistory, Giuseppe Sarto (the future Pope Pius X) was named Bishop of Mantua. The official papal document announcing Maes's appointment was dated October 1, 1884. He was the first diocesan priest from Detroit to become a bishop. As bishop-elect, he attended the third Plenary Council of Baltimore from November to December 1884.

Maes received his episcopal consecration on January 25, 1885 from Archbishop William Henry Elder of Cincinnati, with Bishop Borgess of Detroit and Bishop William George McCloskey of Louisville serving as co-consecrators. He served as Bishop of Covington until his death 30 years later, the longest-serving head of the diocese to date. At the time of his arrival, the diocese counted a Catholic population of 38,000 people, 42 parishes, and 38 priests; by the year preceding his death, there were 60,000 Catholics, 57 parishes, 25 missions, and 85 diocesan and religious priests. During his tenure, he also celebrated the silver jubilee of his ordination as a priest in 1893 and bishop in 1910.

New cathedral
At the beginning of his tenure in Covington, St. Mary's Cathedral had fallen into disrepair, even described as "rapidly tottering to decay." Maes soon began plans for the construction of a new cathedral, a process that would span his entire time as bishop. In 1890 he purchased property at the corner of Madison Avenue and Twelfth Street, a site that was considered to be the center of the city. To design the building, he hired a Detroit architect who had worked on St. Anne's Church and based his plans on Notre-Dame de Paris. Ground was first broken on April 13, 1894 and the cornerstone was laid on September 8, 1895. Although parts of the cathedral remained unfinished past his death, Maes dedicated the new cathedral on January 27, 1901 and opened it for services.

Higher education
Maes was a prominent advocate for higher education in the Catholic Church. While attending the Plenary Council of Baltimore in 1884, he spoke strongly in favor of creating the Catholic University of America. He served as a member of the board of trustees from the time the university was established in 1887 until his death in 1915.

He also served on the bishops' board of directors for his alma mater, the American College of Louvain. Following the death of Archbishop Francis Janssens in 1897, Maes succeeded him as president of the board. He was the initial choice to become rector of the college in 1891 but the Belgian bishops objected, considering it inappropriate to have a bishop at head of a filial institution to the Catholic University of Leuven while the university's rector (Jean Baptiste Abbeloos) was only a priest.

Promotion of the Eucharist
Maes was also noted for his devotion to the Eucharist. He helped organize the Priests' Eucharistic League in the United States, serving as its first national moderator and editor of its monthly publication Emmanuel. In October 1895 he chaired the first Eucharistic congress in the country at Washington, D.C., which was attended by more than 20 bishops and 300 priests (including Apostolic Delegate Francesco Satolli). He was elected permanent president of the Eucharistic Congresses in the United States, and participated in the international gatherings at Namur (1902), Metz (1907), Montreal (1910), Vienna (1912), and Lourdes (1914).

Later life and death
In 1914, during his last ad limina visit to Rome, Maes made a stop at his native country and was deeply distressed to see that his childhood home had been destroyed during World War I. His health began to deteriorate, worsened by complications with diabetes. He died at St. Elizabeth Hospital in Covington on May 11, 1915, aged 69.

References

External links
 Diocese of Covington Entry on Former Bishops, including Bishop Maes

Episcopal succession

Roman Catholic bishops of Covington
19th-century Roman Catholic bishops in the United States
20th-century Roman Catholic bishops in the United States
1846 births
1915 deaths
Belgian emigrants to the United States
Catholic University of Leuven (1834–1968) alumni
American College of the Immaculate Conception alumni
Roman Catholic Archdiocese of Detroit
Catholics from Kentucky